Prince Leopold may refer to:

People

Anhalt-Dessau 
 Leopold I, Prince of Anhalt-Dessau (1676–1747)
 Leopold II, Prince of Anhalt-Dessau  (1700–1751)

Bavaria 
 Prince Leopold of Bavaria (1846–1930)
 Prince Leopold of Bavaria (born 1943)

Belgium 
 Leopold I of Belgium (1790–1865), Prince of Saxe-Coburg and Gotha before becoming king in 1831
 Leopold II of Belgium (1835–1909), before becoming king in 1865
 Leopold III of Belgium (1901–1983), before becoming king in 1934
 Prince Leopold, Duke of Brabant (1859–1869)

Lippe 
 Leopold I, Prince of Lippe  (1767–1802)
 Leopold II, Prince of Lippe  (1796–1851)
 Leopold III, Prince of Lippe  (1821–1875)
 Leopold IV, Prince of Lippe  (1871–1949)

Others 
 Leopold, Prince of Anhalt-Köthen, (1694–1728)
 Leopold, Prince of Hohenzollern  (1835–1905)
 Leopold, Prince of Salerno  (1790–1851)
 Prince Leopold, Duke of Albany (1853–1884)
 Prince Leopold of Saxe-Coburg and Gotha  (1824–1884)
 Prince Leopold, Count of Syracuse  (1813–1860)
 Lord Leopold Mountbatten (1889–1922), known as Prince Leopold of Battenberg from his birth until 1917

Other uses 
 Prince Leopold (horse), a racehorse
 Léopold Clément, Hereditary Prince of Lorraine (1707–1723), heir apparent to Duchy of Lorraine
 Prince Leopold Clement of Saxe-Coburg and Gotha (1878–1916), Austro-Hungarian officer; heir apparent to House of Koháry's wealth